Aleksandr Nemirko (born 8 February 2000) is a Belarusian professional footballer who plays for Dnepr Mogilev.

References

External links 
 
 

2000 births
Living people
Belarusian footballers
Association football midfielders
FC BATE Borisov players
FC Gomel players
FC Dnepr Mogilev players